Ian Kidgell (born 21 November 1970) is a former Australian rules footballer who played with the Brisbane Bears in the Australian Football League (AFL).

Kidgell was originally listed by Hawthorn and played for their Under 19s and Reserves in 1989 and 1990 before leaving Hawthorn to go to Brisbane in the 1991 Pre-season Draft.

Kidgell played three senior games for Brisbane in 1991 before returning to Hawthorn Reserves 1992, Essendon Reserves 1993, Oakleigh (VFA) 1994, Monbulk (1st Div YVMDFL 1995-2001 - a member of Monbulk's 1997 and 1998 premiership teams)

A champion High Jumper as a junior, and standing 203 cm, he was the Bears tallest ever player and was blessed with great athleticism, Kidgell had to wait until round 21 to make his debut.

References

1970 births
Brisbane Bears players
Australian rules footballers from Victoria (Australia)
Living people
Old Haileyburians Amateur Football Club players
Oakleigh Football Club players